Lady Alexandra Mary Cecilia Caroline Paget (15 June 1913 – 22 May 1973) was an English socialite and actress.

Early life and family
Lady Caroline was born Lady Alexandra Mary Cecilia Caroline Paget on 15 June 1913. She was the eldest child of Charles Paget, 6th Marquess of Anglesey, and his wife, the former Lady Victoria Manners. Lady Caroline's mother was the daughter of Henry Manners, 8th Duke of Rutland.

Career 
During the 1930s, she was a notable British socialite, and a minor actress. She was beloved of the artist Rex Whistler, who painted numerous portraits of her, including a startling nude, which is on display at Plas Newydd, (the ancestral home of the Marquess of Anglesey). Lady Caroline Paget was the unrequited love of Elizabeth Parrish Starr. There are several references to her in the published journals of Edith Olivier and The National Screen and Sound Archive of Wales  has footage of short films featuring Caroline and her sister Elizabeth, as well as other material.

Personal life and death 
On 14 July 1949, Lady Caroline married Sir Michael Duff, 3rd Baronet, becoming his second wife. Together they adopted one child, Charles Duff (b. 1950).

Lady Caroline Duff died on 22 May 1973, at the age of 59.

References

1913 births
1973 deaths
Daughters of British marquesses
Wives of baronets
British socialites
Caroline
20th-century British actresses